Umberto Tachinardi, MD, MSc, Fellow ACMI, is a Brazilian-born chief information officer and biomedical informaticist. Trained by the founders (Candido Pinto de Melo, Lincoln de Assis Moura Jr and Sergio Shiguemi Furuie) of the prestigious Medical Informatics group of the Heart Institute of São Paulo University Medical School (InCor - Instituto do Coração da Universidade de São Paulo), he started his career developing biomedical signal processing systems on cardiology. Dr. Tachinardi pioneered the use of secure world-wide-web (internet) communications for transmission of medical records in 1994. In addition, he has devoted many years to innovate clinical practice through the development and deployment of integrated clinical information systems as CIO of the InCor and later as the CIO of the Secretary of Health, State of São Paulo. Dr. Tachinardi has thus worked extensively on matters of reengineering the administration and management of medical practices on a large scale.
Dr. Tachinardi, newly appointed Assistant Dean for Clinical Informatics at the Indiana University School of Medicine is also a Professor of Statistics. Dr. Tachinardi has presented over 175 publications, invited lectures, and tutorials.

Key Biography
Former president of the Brazilian Society of Health Informatics.
Member of the editorial board of the Journal of Health Informatics

Honors
2005 Nominated Best Information Technology Professional, Government Sector. Informatics Today [Plano Editorial, Informática Hoje], Brazil. (Top 5 best),
2004 Nominated Best Information Technology Professional, Government Sector. Informatics Today [Plano Editorial, Informática Hoje], Brazil. (Top 5 best)
2003 First Place. Best Information Technology Professional, Health Care Sector. Informatics Today [Plano Editorial, Informática Hoje], Brazil.
 2002 Top 100 IT Leaders.  Computerworld, Brazilian Edition.
 2001 Top 50 Information Technology Executives. Info Exame, Brazil
 1998 Best Implementation Project in Health Care, National Council of Public Informatics (CONIP), Brazil.

Publications
 Medline Publications
 Google Scholar Citations

References

External links
 Umberto Tachinardi’s Linkedin page

Living people
Academic staff of the University of São Paulo
University of São Paulo alumni
University of Chicago faculty
Health informaticians
Year of birth missing (living people)